Recoverhallen (former Relitahallen) is an indoor bandy venue in Uppsala, Sweden, opened on 11 September 2011 with the game IK Sirius–Yenisey Krasnoyarsk 5–4.

On 6 and 7 September 2013, double international games between Sweden and Finland with both A- and U23 games were held inside.

In March and April 2021, the Swedish Bandy Championship final games for both women and men was played inside the arena.

References

External links
 Recoverhallen 

2011 establishments in Sweden
Bandy venues in Sweden
Buildings and structures in Uppsala County
Sport in Uppsala
Sports venues completed in 2011